The 1996–97 Superliga Espanola de Hockey Hielo season was the 23rd season of the Superliga Espanola de Hockey Hielo, the top level of ice hockey in Spain. Six teams participated in the league, and FC Barcelona won the championship.

Standings

Playoffs

External links
Season on hockeyarchives.info

Liga Nacional de Hockey Hielo seasons
Spa
Liga